ShareScope is a data analysis, portfolio management and charting software package developed by Ionic Information for private investors. March 2015 saw the launch of SharePad, a web-based alternative that can be used on tablets, Macs or Windows PC.

All products supply news from Alliance news.

All versions of ShareScope/SharePad allow users to analyse the data using both fundamental analysis and technical analysis.

Data sources
SharePad and ShareScope provide data for:

Shares
Exchange-traded funds
Unit trusts
Investment trusts
Gilt-edged securities, European Central Bank and US Treasuries bonds
 Stock market indices - all major and many minor indices
Corporate bonds
Selected Commodities
Foreign exchange market
Warrants
Market sector Price–earnings ratios and yields
 Other instruments used to trade on various markets such as Permanent interest bearing shares, American Depositary Receipts and Global Depository Receipts.

Data is received from:
London stock exchange
Nasdaq
New York stock exchange
CME (Chicago)
European exchanges

Add-ons 
Alpesh Patel Special Edition is an add-on to all versions of ShareScope, which includes Alpesh's own stock-screening filters, chart set-ups, stock commentary and a monthly newsletter delivered via ShareScope.
Level 2 data from the London Stock Exchange is also available as an add-on for ShareScope Gold and ShareScope Plus. It is included free in ShareScope Pro and SharePad Pro.

Scripting language

ShareScope customers can also make use of ShareScript, a scripting language based on JavaScript, that forms part of the functionality of ShareScope Plus and ShareScope Pro.

Users can share ShareScripts via an online library and ask for help from each other and ShareScope Support staff on ShareScope's dedicated forums.

Awards 
ShareScope has been the recipient of 47 awards in 19 years, including the UK's Best Investment Software for the last 12 years running. Awards include:

Investors Chronicle
Best Investment Software: every year 2002 to 2019 excluding 2007
Best Level 2 Data Provider: 2008
Services to Private investors: Martin Stamp 2017

Shares magazine Best Investment Software, 2002-2015 and 2017

MoneyWeek Best Investment Software Provider, 2014.

External links
ShareScope Official website
Alpha Terminal - Professional data terminal from Ionic Information

References

Technical analysis software